The One Hundred Thirty-first Ohio General Assembly was a meeting of the Ohio state legislature, composed of the Ohio State Senate and the Ohio House of Representatives.  It convened in Columbus, Ohio on January 5, 2015 and is scheduled to adjourn January 2, 2017.  The apportionment of legislative districts is based on the 2010 United States census and 2011 redistricting plan.  Both the Ohio Senate and Ohio House of Representatives were retained by the Ohio Republican Party.

Party summary
Resignations and new members are discussed in the "Changes in membership" section, below.

Senate

House of Representatives

Leadership

Senate
Senate President: Keith Faber
President Pro Tempore: Larry Obhof
Majority (Republican) leadership 
Majority Floor Leader: Tom Patton
Majority Whip: Gayle Manning
Minority (Democratic) leadership
Senate Minority Leader: Joe Schiavoni
Assistant Minority Leader: Charleta Tavares
Minority Whip: Edna Brown
Assistant Minority Whip: Lou Gentile

House of Representatives
Speaker of the House: Cliff Rosenberger
Speaker Pro Tempore: Ron Amstutz
Majority (Republican) leadership 
Majority Floor Leader: Kirk Schuring
Assistant Majority Floor Leader: Jim Buchy
Majority Whip: Dorothy Pelanda
Assistant Majority Whip: Sarah LaTourette
Minority (Democratic) leadership
 House Minority Leader: Fred Strahorn
Assistant Minority Leader: Nicholas J. Celebrezze
Minority Whip: Nickie Antonio
Assistant Minority Whip: Jack Cera

Membership

Senate

House of Representatives

See also
 List of Ohio state legislatures

References

Ohio legislative sessions
2015 in Ohio
2016 in Ohio
Ohio
Ohio